The Belarusian People's Republic (BNR;), or Belarusian Democratic Republic, was a state proclaimed by the Council of the Belarusian Democratic Republic in its Second Constituent Charter on 9 March 1918 during World War I. The Council proclaimed the Belarusian Democratic Republic independent in its Third Constituent Charter on 25 March 1918 during the occupation of contemporary Belarus by the Imperial German Army.

The government of the Belarusian Democratic Republic never had power over the whole territory of Belarus. In 1919, it co-existed with an alternative Soviet Russia-controlled Socialist Soviet Republic of Byelorussia (which later became part of the Lithuanian–Byelorussian Soviet Socialist Republic), moving its seat of government to Vilnius and Grodno, but ceased to exist due to the partition of the whole Belarusian territory between the Bolshevik Red Army and the Polish Armed Forces as a result of the Polish–Soviet War of 1919–1921.

Currently, its government in exile, the Rada (Council) of the Belarusian Democratic Republic is the oldest still functioning government in exile.

Name 
In some historical documents, the White Ruthenian Democratic Republic phrase was used initially. In the current scholarship, Belarusian Democratic Republic and Belarusian National Republic names dominate. The Rada BNR uses the Belarusian Democratic Republic name. It also appears in the publications originating in Belarus. The Belarusian People's Republic appears in publications, however, its use is comparatively limited, e.g. it does not appear in the titles of scholarly publications.

History 

After the 1917 February Revolution in Russia, active discussions started in Belarus about either gaining autonomy within the new Russian Republic or declaring independence. Deputies of most Belarusian regions and of different political powers, including the Belarusian Socialist Assembly, the Christian democratic movement and the General Jewish Labour Bund, formed a Belarusian National Council in late 1917. The Council started working on establishing Belarusian governmental institutions. Both the Bolsheviks and Germans refused to recognize it and interfered in its activity. However, the Germans saw an independent Belarus as part of the implementation of their plan for buffer states within Mitteleuropa. The Bolsheviks had negotiations with the Belarusian Democratic Republic regarding eventual recognition, but later decided instead to establish a pro-Soviet government of Belarus – the Soviet Socialist Republic of Belarus.

Parallel with negotiations that started between the Germans and Bolsheviks, the Belarusian Council started actively demanding recognition of autonomous status for Belarus, with continuing internal discussions on whether it should become an autonomous region within Russia or declare national independence.

On 21 February 1918, the German army captured Minsk. 21 February, the Belarusian Council passed the First Constituent Charter declaring the council the only legitimate power on the territory of Belarus. Neither the occupying authorities, nor its government in Berlin, however, were interested in the idea of an independent Belarusian state.

On 3 March, Germans and Bolsheviks signed the Treaty of Brest-Litovsk. On 6 March, the Belarusian Council passed the Second Charter declared the establishment of the Belarusian People's Republic. The Council became the provisional government of Belarus and was renamed the Council of the Belarusian People's Republic.

On March 25, 1918, the All-Belarusian Congress proclaimed the independence of the Belarusian National Republic (Bielaruskaja Narodnaja Respublika, abbreviated as BNR). The Government of the BNR left Minsk in December 1918 for the Lithuanian Republic, and in the spring of 1919 went into exile.

Territory
In its Third Constituent Charter, the following territories were claimed for BNR: Mogilev Governorate (province), as well as Belarusian parts of Minsk Governorate, Grodno Governorate (including Belastok), Vilna Governorate, Vitebsk Governorate, and Smolensk Governorate, and parts of bordering governorates populated by Belarusians, rejecting the then split of the Belarusian lands between Germany and Russia. The areas were claimed because of a Belarusian majority or large minority (as in Grodno and Vilna Governorate), although there were also numbers of Lithuanians, Poles and people speaking mixed varieties of Belarusian, Lithuanian and Polish, as well as many Jews, mostly in towns and cities (in some towns they made up a majority). Some of the Jews spoke Russian as their native tongue; others spoke Yiddish.

Military

There were attempts to create regular armed forces of the newly established Belarusian People's Republic. Belarusian military units started to form within the disorganized Imperial Russian Army already in 1917.

According to the historian Oleg Latyszonek, about 11,000 people, mostly volunteers, served in the Army of the Belarusian People's Republic.

General Stanisław Bułak-Bałachowicz supported the Government of the People's Republic and openly positioned his army as a Belarusian national army.

The major military action of the Army of the People's Republic was the Slutsk defence action in late 1920. The Council of the BNR, based at that time in Lithuania, sent officers to help organize armed anti-Bolshevik resistance in the town of Slutsk.

Foreign relations

During its short existence, the government of Belarus established close ties with the Ukrainian People's Republic, organized food supplies to Belarus from Ukraine and thereby prevented hunger in the country.

Beginning in 1918, Anton Łuckievič, the prime minister of Belarus, met with Vladimir Lenin hoping to gain recognition for the independence of Belarus by Soviet Russia. The Belarusian delegation even proposed the creation of a federation with the RSFSR and the adoption of the Soviet Constitution in Belarus in exchange for Russia recognizing the independent status of Belarus, but Lenin did not agree to these proposals.

In 1919, a delegation of the Belarusian People's Republic under Prime Minister Anton Łuckievič participated in the Paris Peace Conference, attempting to gain international recognition of the independence of Belarus. On the way to the conference, the delegation was received by Czechoslovak president Tomáš Masaryk in Prague. During the conference, Łuckievič had meetings with the exiled foreign minister of Admiral Kolchak's Russian government Sergey Sazonov and the prime minister of Poland Ignacy Jan Paderewski.

In October 1919 the Belarusian People's Republic was officially recognized by Estonia and in December 1919 by Finland. On November 11, 1920, the Belarusian People's Republic signed a treaty with the government of Lithuania in which both states declared to recognize each other and to cooperate together.

Other actions

The government also managed to create between 150 and 350 schools and preparations for the creation of a university in Minsk were initiated.

Exile

In December 1918, the German army retreated from the territory of Belarus and the Red Army moved in to establish the Socialist Soviet Republic of Belarus. The Rada (Council) of the BNR moved to Grodno, the center of a semi-autonomous Belarusian region within the Republic of Lithuania. During the subsequent 1919–1920 Soviet-Polish War, the Rada went into exile and facilitated an anti-Communist struggle within the country during the 1920s.

In 1925, the exiled Rada of the Belarusian Democratic Republic (Rada BDR) discussed relinquishing its authority in favor of the Belarusian Soviet Socialist Republic controlling the eastern part of Belarus. Despite many members of the democratic government advocating this idea, the proposal was not approved.

During World War II, the Belarusian government-in-exile, based in Prague, refused to cooperate with Nazi Germany or with the Belarusian Central Rada, the pro-German puppet government and issued statements in support of the Western Allies.

The advance of the Red Army in 1945 forced the BNR's Rada to relocate to the western part of Germany, occupied by British and American troops. In February 1948, the Rada passed a special manifesto, by which it declared its return to activity. In April 1948 the Rada, together with deputys of the Belarusian post-war refugees, held a conference in Osterhofen, Bavaria.

After the dissolution of the Soviet Union in the 1990s, similar governments-in-exile of the neighboring countries (Lithuania, Poland and others) handed back their mandates to the corresponding independent governments.

Upon declaration of independence of the Belarusian Soviet Socialist Republic in 1990, it was stated then that the Rada was ready to hand its status to a democratically elected parliament of Belarus. The parliament of Belarus of that time had been elected under Soviet rule. However, these plans were dropped after president Alexander Lukashenko, elected in the 1994 presidential election, established an authoritarian regime accompanied by a return to Soviet policies in regards to Belarusian language and culture.

The Rada BNR still exists as a government in exile and attempts to lobby for interests of the Belarusian diaspora in countries where it has its deputies.

Since the late 1980s, March 25, the Independence Day of the Belarusian Democratic Republic, is widely celebrated by the Belarusian national democratic opposition as Freedom Day. It is usually accompanied by mass opposition rallies in Minsk and by celebration events of the Belarusian diaspora organizations supporting the Belarusian government in exile.

Symbols

A national flag of three stripes — white-red-white — was adopted, as well as a state seal (Pahonia) based on an emblem of the Grand Duchy of Lithuania.

Presidents
Chairpersons of the Council of the Belarusian People's Republic:
 Jan Sierada (1918)
 Jazep Losik (1918–1919; acting)
 Piotra Krečeŭski (1919–1928)
 Vasil Zacharka (1928–1943)
 Mikoła Abramčyk (1944–1970)
 Vincent Žuk-Hryškievič (1970–1980)
 Jazep Sažyč (1980–1997)
 Ivonka Survilla (1997–present)

Archives
In 1998, Belarusian linguist and translator Siarhiej Šupa published a two-volume collection of BNR archives (Архівы Беларускай Народнай Рэспублікі. Менск-Вільня-Прага-Нью-Ёрк). The total size of the two volumes is more than 1700 pages. Essentially these are the processed and re-organized documents from the Lithuanian archival fund #582 in Vilnius and they constitute roughly 60% of all the BNR official documents from 1918. Another 20% of BNR official documentation is located in the Minsk archives, and the fate of the remaining 20% is unknown.

See also
Freedom Day (Belarus)
Ukrainian People's Republic

References

Further reading

External links
 The Rada of the Belarusan Democratic Republic in Exile website
 
 
 Timeline of Belarusian People's Republic

 
1918 in Belarus
Belarusian independence movement
Post–Russian Empire states
Belarusian diaspora in Europe
Former unrecognized countries
States and territories established in 1918
States and territories disestablished in 1919
Former republics